Jimmy Hussey (Chicago, January 18, 1891 - November 20, 1930 North Bergen, New Jersey) was an American comedian and vaudeville star.

Vaudevilles
Travesty 1919 - military playlette "Somewhere".
Tattle Tales 1920 - librettist and producer Jimmy Hussey.
The Whirl of the Town 1921 Shubert musical revue, staged Jimmy Hussey, including Mae West

References

1891 births
1930 deaths
American male comedians
Vaudeville performers
Comedians from New Jersey
People from Chicago